Kishor Gajanan Jorgewar  (born 17 December 1968 ) is an Indian politician. He was elected to the Maharashtra Legislative Assembly from Chandrapur in the 2019 Maharashtra Legislative Assembly election as a member of the Independent candidate. Previously, he was associated to Shiv Sena. He is also a president of Young Chanda Brigade, Chandrapur and Vidharbh Burud Samaj.

Early life 
Kishoar Jorgewar was Born in Chandrapur.  He completed his schooling from Chandrapur.  He has been working for more than 14 years for common peoples of Chandrapur District on various issues such as relief to flood affected peoples. He has been working in the field of providing education, jobs, city development and all other common problems. also people of chandrapur quoted him as "The leader of the masses" for his social work.

Political career 
He has vast experience in politics and social framework of Chandrapur District. He has been a Board of Director of Shri. Kanyaka Nagri Co-operative Bank. He has played a pivotal role in upliftment of backward class Youth. He is a president of Young Chanda Brigade, Chandrapur and Vidharbh Burud Samaj.

In the 2019 Maharashtra Legislative Assembly election as a member of the Independent candidate Kishor Jorgewar made a historic victory winning by a massive margin of 72,107 votes from Chandrapur constituency.

References 

1969 births
Living people
Shiv Sena politicians
People from Chandrapur
Maharashtra MLAs 2019–2024